Amazing Grace Bible Church (アメージンググレースバイブルチャーチ) is a bilingual (English and Japanese) Christian church located in Fujisawa, Kanagawa, Japan. There are two services per week, with nine bible study classes. The church sponsors monthly non-denominational seminars in Kanagawa Prefecture, with spiritual retreats held all over Japan. In addition, both sermons and classes are held weekly via video conferencing with members living in China and America.

History
In March 2001, the Rising Sun School opened in Fujisawa, Japan  with a Christian focus on teaching English. After several years of offering bible classes and building a congregation, an official church was licensed in July 2006.

In 2008, the term "Bible" was added to the church name to distinguish it from other denominational churches. The congregation has evolved into a mix of residents from the Kanagawa Prefecture area and numerous international families.

Administration

 Hiromi Stemmons - Pastor
 Yuasa Yoko - Associate Pastor
 Founding Pastor John Stemmons died on February 28, 2015.

Church Library
The Amazing Grace Bible Church has an extensive collection of bible study materials in print, digital, and online formats. These scripture-based teachings include podcasts, newsletters, and a spiritual book series, Faith From Fujisawa.

References

External links
 Church Website

Buildings and structures in Fujisawa, Kanagawa
Churches in Japan
Christian organizations established in 2001
21st-century churches in Japan
Religious buildings and structures in Kanagawa Prefecture
2001 establishments in Japan
21st-century Protestant churches